is a city located in Nagano Prefecture, Japan. , the city had an estimated population of 29,440 in 12,068 households, and a population density of 262 persons per km².

Geography
Tōmi is located in east-central Nagano Prefecture, at an elevation of between 500 and 1000 meters. The city is bordered by the Joshinetsu Kogen National Park to the north, and Mount Tateshina and Mount Yatsugatake to the south. The Chikuma River divides the city into two parts.

Surrounding municipalities
Nagano Prefecture
 Ueda
 Komoro
 Saku
 Tateshina
 Gunma Prefecture
 Tsumagoi

Climate
Due to its elevation, the city has a climate characterized by hot and humid summers, and cold, very snowy winters (Köppen Dwb).

History
Tōmi is located in former Shinano Province and developed as a series of post stations on the Hokkoku Kaidō. The modern city of Tōmi was established on April 1, 2004, from the merger of the village of Kitamimaki (from Kitasaku District) and the town of Tōbu (from Chiisagata District).

Demographics
Per Japanese census data, the population of Tōmi has remained relatively steady over the past 70 years.

Government
Tōmi has a mayor-council form of government with a directly elected mayor and a unicameral city legislature of 17 members.

Economy
Tōmi is a regional commercial center. Notable agricultural products include rice, walnuts and grapes.  Nissin Kogyo, an automotive parts company specializing in the manufacture of braking systems for 2- and 4-wheeled vehicles, has its headquarters in the city.

Education
Tōmi has four public elementary schools and one public middle school operated by the city government, and one public high school operated by the Nagano Prefectural Board of Education. Previously the city had a Brazilian school, Colégio Pitágoras-Brasil. It moved to Minowa and changed its name to Nagano Nippaku Gakuen.

Transportation

Railway
  Shinano Railway - Shinano Railway Line
  -

Highway
 Jōshin-etsu Expressway

International relations
 Madras, Oregon, United States

Local attractions
Un-no-Juku, a post station on the Hokkoku Kaidō
Intate stone age settlement ruins, Jomon period settlement trace and archaeological park, a National Historic Site

Notable people
 Raiden Tameemon (1767–1825), sumo wrestler
 Keiichi Tsuchiya (born 1956), racing driver
 Mochizuki Chiyome

References

External links

 

 
Cities in Nagano Prefecture